Ratchaneewan Bulakul (born 1 July 1963) is a Thai former swimmer. She competed in three events at the 1976 Summer Olympics.

References

1963 births
Living people
Ratchaneewan Bulakul
Ratchaneewan Bulakul
Swimmers at the 1976 Summer Olympics
Place of birth missing (living people)
Asian Games medalists in swimming
Ratchaneewan Bulakul
Ratchaneewan Bulakul
Swimmers at the 1974 Asian Games
Swimmers at the 1978 Asian Games
Medalists at the 1978 Asian Games
Southeast Asian Games medalists in swimming
Ratchaneewan Bulakul
Ratchaneewan Bulakul
Competitors at the 1973 Southeast Asian Peninsular Games
Competitors at the 1975 Southeast Asian Peninsular Games
Ratchaneewan Bulakul